Twilight is a 1969 Cambodian film composed, written, produced, and directed by Norodom Sihanouk, who also stars in the lead role of Prince Adit.

Plot
This film by Prince Norodom Sihanouk is based on the book Angkor by the famous French archaeologist Bernard Groslier in which he described the beauty of the temples of Angkor. Sihanouk created a triangular love story which has as background the temples of Angkor, with an Indian heroine (Maharani Maya), role played in the film by his wife Princess Monique, who falls in love with a Khmer prince (Prince Adit).

Cast
Norodom Sihanouk as Prince Adit
Monique Sihanouk as Maharani Maya
Kong Sam Oeurn as Rudolf Valentino
Kishin Relwani as Ambassodor
Dy Saveth as Sopheap
Visakha Tioulong as Madame Visakha
Som Sam Al

Reception
The film won the Golden Apsara Award at the 1969 Phnom Penh International Film Festival.

It was screened at several festivals internationally, including the 4th International Film Festival of India.

See also
Angkor

References

External links

1969 films
Cambodian drama films
Khmer-language films